Jian'an (February 196 – March 220) was the fifth era name of Emperor Xian of China's Eastern Han dynasty, and was used for a total of 25 years. It was the era name established by Emperor Xian when he was in exile during the rebellion of Li Jue and Guo Si. In 196, Cao Cao welcomed Emperor Xian in Xu County (present-day Jian'an District, Xuchang, Henan Province) and began to control the government, "holding the emperor to order the princes" (挾天子以令諸侯), so the Jian'an period can also be said to be the period when Cao Cao was in power. During this period, Cao Cao had basically unified the north, and the situation of the Three Kingdoms was also established during this period.

After Cao Cao's death in March 220 (Jian'an 25, 3rd month), the era was changed to Yankang 1 (延康元年, "the first year of the Yankang era").

Comparison table
Note that Chinese eras run from Chinese New Year to Chinese New Year using the Chinese lunisolar calendar and do not directly correspond to Gregorian dates.

Legacy
The Jian'an era is remembered in the names of the Seven Scholars of Jian'an and Jian'an poetry, as well as the Jian'an District of Xuchang in Henan, China.

See also
 List of Chinese era names

References

Further reading

Chinese imperial eras